The SOAS Bulletin of Burma Research is an academic journal specializing in Burma studies and history that was published twice a year at the School of Oriental and African Studies at the University of London. It was last published in 2008.

Articles included original research as well as reprints of important historical sources. The journal also contained book reviews, abstracts for recent doctoral dissertations, and announcements.

The journal was published in PDF format with a small number of hard copies deposited in selected libraries.

External links 
 SOAS Bulletin of Burma Research

Asian history journals
Burma studies journals
Works about Myanmar
Publications established in 2003
Publications disestablished in 2008
SOAS University of London